Sinai Simon Naschér (16 March 1841 – 25 July 1901) was a Hungarian Jewish religious leader and writer.

Biography
Naschér was born to a rabbinic family in Liptó-Szent-Miklós, the son of Eva and Rabbi Moses Naschér. His paternal grandfather, Jonathan Nascher, served as rabbi of Bielitz, Austrian Silesia, while his maternal grandfather, Beer Simandel-Nicolauer, was a rabbi in Liptó-Szent-Miklós. He later studied in Berlin, where he was ordained by the Hochschule für die Wissenschaft des Judentums and received his Ph.D. from the University.

He was, however, eventually forced to resign in 1880 on account of the deterioration of his mental health. From then on he lived in retirement at Baja.

Bibliography

References
 

1841 births
1901 deaths
Writers from Liptovský Mikuláš
Hungarian rabbis
Slovak rabbis
Hungarian writers in German
People from Baja, Hungary
Writers from Berlin
Rabbis from Berlin